The athletics competition in the 1982 Central American and Caribbean Games were held in Havana, Cuba.

Medal summary

Men's events

Women's events

Medal table

See also
1982 in athletics (track and field)

References

 
 
 

1982
Central American and Caribbean Games
Athletics
1982 Central American and Caribbean Games